Angus & Julia Stone is the third studio album by Australian singer-songwriter duo Angus & Julia Stone, released on 1 August 2014 in Australia through EMI Music Australia, and on the same day in the United States through American Recordings. Its release was preceded by the singles "Heart Beats Slow", which peaked at  37 in Australia, "Death Defying Acts" in June, "A Heartbreak" and "Grizzly Bear" in July. The videos for all four songs as well as a video for "Get Home" were directed by Jessie Hill.

American record producer Rick Rubin helped reunite the duo and co-produced the album. Rubin said of the experience: "This album is extraordinary; Angus and Julia are truly unique musicians. They are authentic and pure people who do things from the heart. I've never worked with anyone like them before." The album has been said to contain "blended harmonies [...] and more experimental guitar textures".

The album is the highest-charting by the duo to date, reaching the top 10 in several countries including France, Germany, the Netherlands and New Zealand. With an average of 67 based on 7 reviews on review aggregator Metacritic, Angus & Julia Stone received generally favourable critical reception.

Track listing

Charts

Weekly charts

Year-end charts

Certifications

References

2014 albums
Albums produced by Rick Rubin
Albums recorded at Shangri-La (recording studio)
Angus & Julia Stone albums
EMI Music Australia albums